Jeff Campitelli (born 29 December 1960) is a drummer who has worked with Joe Satriani on many of his albums as well as live performances.  Before Satriani's breakthrough in instrumental music he played with Joe Satriani in a band called The Squares. Campitelli has been selected by Rolling Stone magazine as the 50th greatest drummer of all time. Jeff taught drums at Danville Music Studio in Danville, CA in the 1990s.

References 

Living people
1960 births
20th-century American drummers
American male drummers
20th-century American male musicians